Paddy O'Rourke may refer to:

Sportspeople
 Paddy O'Rourke (association footballer) (1934–2011), Irish footballer for St Patrick's Athletic
 Paddy O'Rourke (cricketer) (born 1965), New Zealand cricketer
 Paddy O'Rourke (Down footballer) (born 1960), Irish Gaelic footballer and manager
 Paddy O'Rourke (Meath footballer) (born 1989), Irish Gaelic footballer

Other people
 Patrick Jake O'Rourke (1947–2022), American libertarian political satirist and journalist

See also
 Patrick O'Rorke (1837-1863), Irish-American soldier who was killed at the Battle of Gettysburg.